The Sunday Times Short Story Award is a British literary award for a single short story open to any novelist or short story writer from around the world who is published in the UK or Ireland. The winner receives £30,000, and the five shortlisted writers each receive £1,000. A longlist of 16 is also announced. The award was established in 2010 by The Sunday Times newspaper with backing by EFG Private Bank. In 2019, award sponsorship changed to Audible. It has been called the richest prize in the world for a single short story.

Another major single-short-story award in the UK is the BBC National Short Story Award, which was called the richest prize in the world for a single short story at £15,000 in 2008, however, as of 2013, The Sunday Times award is twice as large.

Winners and shortlisted nominees

References

External links
Sunday Times Short Story Award, official website

2010 establishments in the United Kingdom
Short story awards
Awards established in 2010
English literary awards
The Sunday Times awards
British literary awards
Literary awards by magazines and newspapers